Dover's powder was a traditional medicine against cold and fever developed by Thomas Dover. It is no longer in use in modern medicine, but may have been in use at least through the 1960s.

A 1958 source describes Dover's Powder as follows:
"Powder of Ipecacuanha and Opium (B.P., Egyp. P., Ind. P.).  Pulv. Ipecac. et Opii; Ipecac and Opium Powder (U.S.N.F.); Dover's Powder; Compound Ipecacuanha Powder.  Prepared ipecacuanha, 10 g., powdered opium 10 g., lactose 80 g.  It contains 1% of anhydrous morphine.  Dose: 320 to 640 mg. (5 to 10 grains).  Many foreign pharmacies include a similar powder, sometimes with potassium sulphate or with equal parts of potassium nitrate and potassium sulphate in place of lactose; max. single dose 1 to 1.5 g. and max. in 24 hours 4 to 6 g."

Named from Doctor Thomas Dover, an English physician of the eighteenth century who first prepared it, the powder was an old preparation of powder of ipecacuanha (which was formerly used to produce syrup of ipecac), opium in powder, and potassium sulfate. The powder was largely used in domestic practice to induce sweating, to defeat the advance of a "cold" and at the beginning of any attack of fever. It was also known by the name pulvis ipecacuanhae et opii.

To obtain the greatest benefits from its use as a sudorific, it was recommended that copious drafts of some warm and harmless drink be ingested after the use of the powder.

The following excerpt from a report penned by a Doctor Sharp, employed in the British naval service in the West Indies, in this case, in Trinidad, in 1818, illustrates its use. He writes : 
At this period, thirty cases of acute dysentery also occurred amongst them and although nineteen of the number were men who arrived in the island from Europe on the 1st and 12th of June, yet, the symptoms even in them were equally as mild as in the assimilated soldier, and the disease yielded to the common remedies – viz – bleeding when the state of the vascular system appeared to indicate the use of it, but in general, saline purgatives in small and repeated quantities were only necessary with small doses at bed time, of calomel and opium, infusion of ipecacuanha or Dover’s powder, and this with tonics, moderate use of port wine and a light farinaceous diet generally and speedily accomplished a perfect case.

India
Dover's powder was banned in India in  1994.

References

External links
 

History of pharmacy
Powders